Prolley Moor (also known as Prolly Moor) is a small dispersed settlement in Shropshire, England, based around a cross roads. The settlement is located one mile from Asterton and half a mile from Wentnor. There are no services at Prolly Moor.

Villages in Shropshire